Sofia Niño de Rivera (born November 23, 1981) is a Mexican stand-up comedian and actress. She was Mexico City's 2016 woman of the year, as named by Chilango, and has been called a "a leading exponent of stand-up comedy in Mexico and Latin America as a whole."

Career 
Niño De Rivera is a cast member on Club de Cuervos, a Spanish-language comedy-drama series on Netflix. She starred in a comedy special on the same platform titled Sofía Niño de Rivera: Expuesta  ("Exposed"), released on June 24, 2016. She was the first woman to be given a Spanish-language Netflix comedy special. Her second Netflix stand-up special, Sofía Niño de Rivera: Selección Natural was released on March 30, 2018.

In March 2017, Niño De Rivera appeared on a special episode of the US talk show Conan titled Conan Without Borders: Made in Mexico.

Personal life 
Niño De Rivera studied in Colegio Vista Hermosa in Mexico City. Niño De Rivera worked in advertising until she was 28, when she decided to start a new career in stand-up comedy. She was influenced by what she saw as heavy bureaucracy and her dislike of how the advertising industry does business.

Works

Comedy specials

References

External links 

Instagram page
YouTube channel

1981 births
Living people
Mexican film actresses
Mexican television actresses
Mexican comedians
Actresses from Mexico City
21st-century Mexican actresses